Bluiett is a surname. Notable people with the surname include:
Hamiet Bluiett (1940-2018), US jazz musician
Trevon Bluiett (b. 1994), US basketball player

See also
Blewett, a surname
Blewit, two species of edible mushrooms
Blewitt, a surname
Bluet (disambiguation)
Bluett, a surname